The term "sesame candy" may also refer to sesame halva.

Sesame seed candy is a confection of sesame seeds and sugar or honey pressed into a bar or ball. It is popular from the Middle East through South Asia to East Asia. The texture may vary from chewy to crisp.  It may also be called sesame (seed) candy/bar/crunch; sesame seed cake may refer to the confection or to a leavened cake or cookie incorporating sesame.

By location

Greece and Cyprus
In Greece and Cyprus, sesame seed candy is called pasteli and is generally a flat, oblong bar made with honey and often including nuts.  Though the modern name παστέλι pasteli is of Italian origin, very similar foods are documented in Ancient Greek cuisine: the Cretan koptoplakous (κοπτοπλακοῦς) or gastris (γάστρις) was a layer of ground nuts sandwiched between two layers of sesame crushed with honey. Herodotus also mentions "sweet cakes of sesame and honey", but with no detail.

Indian subcontinent
Various kinds of sesame candy are found in the cuisine of the Indian subcontinent. Sesame Candy in the forms of Rewri/Revri ("candy coated with sesame seeds"), as well as Gajak ("sugar or jaggery sweet with sesame seeds"), is widely eaten in northern India and Pakistan; the cities of Lucknow and Chakwal are very famous for this product. The Assamese tilor laru is an Assamese breakfast snack. The Maharashtran tilgul ladoo is a ball of sesame and sugar flavored with peanuts and cardamom and associated with the festival of Makar Sankranti.

Vietnam
A variety of sesame seed candy containing peanuts, alongside sesame seeds and granulated sugar, is produced in the central Quảng Ngãi province where it is referred to as Kẹo Gương.  It is believed to have been produced in the region for more than 400 years.

Gallery

See also
 Joyva, an American manufacturer of Sesame Crunch
 Halva
 Yeot-gangjeong
 List of sesame seed dishes

Notes

Sugar confectionery
Ancient Greek cuisine
Chinese confectionery
Chinese desserts
Greek desserts
Indian confectionery
Iranian desserts
Israeli confectionery
Seed candy
Turkish desserts
Honey dishes